This is a list of York Medical Society orators.

 1890 Sir Jonathan Hutchinson, F.R.S., London
 1891 Mr. C. G. Wheelhouse, F.R.C.S.
 1892 Sir T. Clifford Albutt, K.C.B., F.R.S., Cambridge
 1893 Sir Victor Horsley, F.R.S., London
 1894 Sir James Crichton-Browne, F.R.S., London
 1895 Dr. German Sims Woodhead, F.R.S.E., Cambridge
 1896 Sir W. F. Mitchell Banks, F.R.C.S., liverpool
 1897 Sir James F. Goodheart, Bart, London
 1898 Sir T. Lauder Brunton, Bart, F.R.S., London
 1899 Dr. H. W. Balfour, F.R.S.E., Edinburgh
 1900 Professor Alexander Macalister, F.R.S., Cambridge
 1901 Sir George Savage, London
 1902 Dr. P. H. Pye-Smith, London
 1903 Dr. Norman Moore 
 1904 Dr. Newsholme, London
 1905 Sir William Church, Bart, K.C.B., London
 1906 Sir William Henry Allchin, F.R.S.E., London
 1907 Dr. E. Hope, Liverpool
 1908 Sir Thomas S. Clouston, Edinburgh
 1909 Sir William Osler, Bart, F.R.S., Oxford
 1910 Dr. T.D. Acland, London
 1911 Professor J.W. Smith, Manchester
 1912 Dr. S. Monkton, Copeman, London
 1913 Mr. Stephen Paget, F.R.C.S., London
 1920 Dr. W. A. Potts, Birmingham
 1921 Professor Wardrop Griffiths, Leeds
 1922 Professor Louise McIlroy, London
 1923 Professor Edwin Bramwell
 1924 Sir Frank Colyer, London
 1925 Walter Langdon-Brown, London
 1926 Sir Berkeley Moyhnihan, Bart, Leeds
 1927 Sir Farquhar Buzzard, London
 1928 Mr. Dan Mackenzie, F.R.C.S., London
 1929 Mr. Duncan C. L. Fitzwilliam, F.R.C.S., London
 1930 Sir Thomas Horder, Bart, K.C.V.O., London
 1931 Lord Moynihan of Leeds, K.C.M.G., C.B.
 1932 Professor D.P.D. Wilkie, Edinburgh
 1933 Sir Charlton Briscoe, Bart, London
 1934 Col. L.W. Harrison, D.S.O., F.R.C.P., London
 1935 Lord Dawson of Penn, P.C., G.C.V.O., K.C.B., London
 1936 Sir Henry Brackenbury, London
 1937 Sir Maurice Cassidy, London
 1938 A.E. Barclay, Oxford
 1946 Professor J.C. Spence, M.D., F.R.C.P., University of Durham
 1947 Professor R.W. Johnstone, C.B.E., University of Edinburgh
 1948 Sir Harold Gillies, C.B.E., London
 1949 Sir Henry Cohen, M.D., F.R.C.P., University of Liverpool
 1950 Dr. Harley Williams, London
 1951 Lord Moran of Manton, M.C.
 1952 Sir Sydney Smith, C.B.E., University of Edinburgh
 1953 Dr. Keith Simpson, University of London
 1954 Terence East, King's College Hospital, London
 1955 Dr. William Pickles, M.D., D.S.C., M.R.C.P., Aysgarth
 1956 Mr. R.H. Franklin, F.R.C.S., Postgraduate School, London
 1957 Sir Russell Brain, Bart, London
 1958 Professor Ian Aird, Postgraduate School, London
 1959 Professor P. Allison, Oxford
 1960 Professor Sheila Sherlock, University of London
 1961 Professor R.E. Lane, University of Manchester
 1962 Dr. Hugh Garland, Leeds
 1963 Major-General W.R.M. Drew,
 1964 Sir Benjamin Rycroft, OBE, London
 1965 Sir Derrick Dunlop, Edinburgh
 1966 Professor J.C. McLure Browne, University of London
 1967 Dr. J.H.F. Brotherston, Edinburgh
 1968 Emeritus Professor D.F. Cappell, University of Glasgow
 1969 Sir John Richardson, London
 1970 Sir Henry Osmond-Clarke, london
 1971 Dr. C.A.H. Watts, Leicester
 1972 Sir John Peel, London
 1973 Lord Foot of Buckland, Monarchorum
 1974 Ekkehard von Kuenssberg, Edinburgh
 1975 Dr. J.R. Ellis, London
 1976 Professor J. Marshall, Institute of Neurology
 1977 Dr. H.W.S. Francis, Manchester
 1978 Alastair Currie, Edinburgh
 1979 Dame Josephine Barnes, London
 1980 Sir Douglas Ranger, London
 1981 Sir Ronald Gibson, Winchester
 1982 Professor Sir John Walton, Newcastle
 1983 Professor J.D. Scadding, London
 1984 Dr. Michael O'Donnell
 1985 Mr. H.H.G. Eastcott, London
 1986 Dr. Michael Trimble, London
 1987 Professor J. Lejeune, Paris
 1988 Professor P. Sleight, Oxford
 1989 Professor J.S. Scott, Leeds
 1990 Professor A.W. Clare, Dublin
 1991 Professor D. Hopkinson, London
 1992 Professor D. Burrows, Belfast
 1993 Professor N. McIntyre, London
 1994 Professor A. Mansfield, London
 1995 Professor R.H. Higgs, London
 1996 Professor J.R. Bennett, Hull
 1997 Dr. J.M. Holt, Oxford
 1998 Professor Michael Baum, London
 1999 Lord McColl, London
 2000 Mr. Peter Leopard, Stoke-on-Trent
 2001 Professor Lewis Wolpert, London
 2002 Professor P.R. Bar, Utrecht
 2003 Professor P. McGuffin, London
 2004 Dr. C.V. Howard, Liverpool
 2005 Professor W. Prendiville, Dublin
 2006 Dr M. Shooter, Cambridge
 2007 Professor David Haslam
 2008 Professor A. Templeton
 2009 Professor Parveen Kumar
 2010 Dr. P. Hamilton
 2011 Professor Sir Mark Walport
 2012 Professor Sir Graeme Catto
 2013 Professor Christopher Ham CBE
 2014 Professor Donal O'Donoghue
 2015 Professor Dame Susan Bailey
 2016 Professor Philip Cachia
 2017 Professor John A H Wass
 2018 The Right Honourable Professor Lord Kakkar
 2019 Ilora Finlay, Baroness Finlay of Llandaff
 2020 Dame Clare Gerada

References 

York Medical Society